John Bell was a 16th-century English priest and academic.

Bell graduated B.A. from Trinity College, Cambridge; M.A. and B.D. from Peterhouse, Cambridge and became a Fellow there in 1554. He was Master of Jesus College, Cambridge from 1579 to 1589; and Dean of Ely from 1589 to his death on 31 October 1591.

References

16th-century English Anglican priests
Deans of Ely
1591 deaths
Alumni of Trinity College, Cambridge
Fellows of Peterhouse, Cambridge
Masters of Jesus College, Cambridge